Michael Lee-Chin,  (born 3 January 1951) is a Jamaican-Canadian billionaire businessman, and philanthropist and the chairman and CEO of Portland Holdings Inc, a privately held investment company in Ontario, Canada.

Lee-Chin was appointed to the Order of Ontario in 2017.

In 2016, Lee-Chin was appointed chairman of the government of Jamaica's Economic Growth Council (EGC).

Lee-Chin has made several large pledges and/or donations in Canada to the Royal Ontario Museum in 2003, the Rotman School of Management at the University of Toronto, McMaster University and the Joseph Brant Hospital Foundation. Lee-Chin served as chancellor of Wilfrid Laurier University.

Background
Lee-Chin was born in Port Antonio, Jamaica, in 1951 to Aston Lee and Hyacinth Gloria Chen. Both his parents were biracial African and Jamaican-Chinese. When Lee-Chin was aged seven, his mother married Vincent Chen who had a son from a previous relationship, and the couple had seven children together, six boys and one girl. Lee-Chin's mother sold Avon products and worked as a bookkeeper for various local firms, while his stepfather ran a local grocery store.

He attended the local high school, Titchfield High, between 1962 and 1969.

Career
In 1965, Lee-Chin's first job came working as part of the landscaping team at the Frenchman's Cove Hotel.  The next year, he got a summer job working on the Jamaica Queen cruise ship, cleaning the engine room.

In 1970, he went to Canada on a scholarship program sponsored by the Jamaican government to study Civil Engineering at McMaster University, and graduated in 1974.
He financed his first year at university on his own but after that was able to attend on scholarship.

After graduating from McMaster, Lee-Chin worked briefly as a road engineer for the Jamaican government,
but unable to find work in his qualified field (and allegedly, because his Canadian wife did not like living in Jamaica), he returned to Canada where he began graduate studies in business. At first he worked as a bouncer, but later found employment as a financial advisor for Investors Group.

Lee-Chin spent two years at the Investors Group, in the Hamilton, Ontario office and in 1979, moved to Regal Capital Planners and became regional manager. While at the company, in 1983, he secured a loan from the Continental Bank of Canada for C$500,000 to purchase a stake in Mackenzie Financial Group and formed Kicks Athletics with Andrew Gayle. By 1987, the investment was worth C$3.5 million.

In 1987, Lee-Chin took the proceeds from his Mackenzie investment to buy a Kitchener-based company called the Advantage Investment Council (a division of AIC Limited) for $200,000. At the time, the company had holdings of around C$800,000. He renamed the company AIC, and developed it to a fund that controlled around C$6 billion, with hundreds of thousands of investors. Following the acquisition of AIC Limited, Lee-Chin set up the Berkshire group of companies, comprising an investment planning arm, a securities dealership and an insurance operation. By 2007, Berkshire had amassed more than C$12 billion of assets under administration. In 2007, Manulife acquired Berkshire from Portland Holdings in exchange for shares, making Portland one of the largest shareholders of Manulife.

In 2009, Lee-Chin sold AIC Limited to Manulife for an undisclosed amount. The following year, Manulife rebranded the heritage AIC funds and eliminated the AIC name from the mutual fund line-up.

In addition to being the founder and Chairman of Portland Holdings Inc., Mr. Lee-Chin is chairman and director of Mandeville Holdings Inc. and Executive Chairman, CEO, and Portfolio Manager of Portland Investment Counsel Inc.

Investments 1990–2005
In the late 1980s, AIC suffered from a collapse in the real estate market, in which it had invested. It recovered throughout the early 1990s by maintaining investments in large groups, such as Merrill Lynch and TD bank (formerly Toronto Dominion). This caused investments to grow from US$8 million in 1990 to nearly US$8 billion by 1998.

Lee-Chin was reluctant to invest in the dotcom boom, and saw AIC investments lose 8 per cent in value, even as the S&P gained 56 per cent. Investors moved US$224 million out of AIC's flagship "Advantage Mutual Fund". The Globe and Mail ran an article predicting that even more investors would leave the fund, meaning that it would run out of cash and be forced to sell its core holdings. Lee-Chin's response was to sell stock in Coca-Cola, and invest US$65 million into Mackenzie Holdings (the same firm in which he had invested US$400,000 16 years previously). Letters were sent to all 350,000 investors, explaining the strategy. The investors were calmed by the purchase, and the stock was later sold to Investor Group (the same company Lee-Chin had worked for in the 1980s) at more than twice the price AIC had paid for it. In 2000 and 2001, following the dotcom crash, AIC outperformed the market with 26 per cent growth and 4 per cent decline respectively.

In November 2003, AIC was part of a regulatory investigation involving 105 Canadian mutual funds companies. In its review of AIC, investigators found no evidence of late trading and market timing activity by AIC staff. However, the Ontario Securities Commission (OSC) did find that over the 1999–2003 period, AIC permitted specific third party investors to engage in market timing trades in AIC Funds that generated profits of $127 million.  In the Settlement Agreement between AIC and the OSC, the OSC stated that "Accordingly, the conduct of AIC in failing to protect fully the best interests of the Relevant Funds in respect of the frequent trading market timing was contrary to the public interest." As a result, in December 2004, AIC Limited was forced to return CAD $58.8 million to affected investors, which was the largest penalty imposed on any of the fund companies in the OSC investigation.

On 5 October 2006, Lee-Chin announced his resignation as CEO of AIC, to be replaced by Jonathan Wellum, AIC's chief investment officer.

In 2005, two investment product managers offering structured products joined the Portland Holdings portfolio, Copernican Capital Corporation has offered retail investment products, primarily sold by brokers, and has raised more than C$800 million, in 10 closed end funds since its launch. Markland Street Asset Management, which launched the Oil Sands Sector Fund, raised C$430 million in one of Canada's largest closed-end IPOs.

Private life
In 1974, he married Vera Lee-Chin, a Ukrainian Canadian whom he had met at university. They separated in 1997 and are now divorced. Vera Lee-Chin had contested the terms of the separation agreement, claiming that Lee-Chin did not disclose his actual wealth at the time of the separation. The couple had three children, Michael Jr., Paul, and Adrian.

Mr. Lee-Chin now lives with his wife Sonya Lee-Chin, with whom he has fraternal-twin daughters, Elizabeth and Maria, in Burlington, Ontario.

Philanthropy
In 2003, he made headlines when he pledged to donate $30 million to the Royal Ontario Museum (ROM) of which a third had been paid as of 2015. He also provided a $10 million gift to the Rotman School of Management at the University of Toronto. The gift established the Michael Lee-Chin Family Institute for Corporate Citizenship at the Rotman School of Management, University of Toronto. The Lee-Chin Institute's purpose is to help current and future business leaders integrate corporate citizenship into business strategy and practices.

In September 2014, Lee-Chin and his family donated $10 million to the Joseph Brant Hospital Foundation.

Michael Lee-Chin and family received the 2015 Association of Fundraising Professionals' (Golden Horseshoe Chapter) National Philanthropy Award in the category of Outstanding Philanthropist.

Current fund growth and difficulties

Investment in Caribbean
In the late 1990s and early 2000s, Jamaica went through a period of financial crisis.
Lee-Chin saw potential in his native country, and Portland purchased 75 per cent of the National Commercial Bank of Jamaica for 6 billion Jamaican dollars (US$127 million) from the Jamaican Government. In 2003, Senvia Money Services Inc., a global money transfer company, was established. This was followed in 2004, by the acquisition of AIC Financial Group Limited, headquartered in Trinidad.

In 2004, he announced plans to set up the AIC Caribbean Fund with the intention of investing in the entire Caribbean region. The stated aim of the fund is to raise US$1 billion in order to "make investments in businesses located in countries of the Caribbean Community (CARICOM), with an emphasis on Jamaica, Barbados and Trinidad and Tobago". So far, it has made a number of large-scale investments.

In 2006, Portland acquired an 85 per cent controlling stake in the United General Insurance Company, the largest auto insurer in Jamaica, and renamed the firm Advantage General Insurance Company. A controlling interest in CVM Communications Group (consisting of radio and television stations and newspapers) was purchased at the same time. Portland partnered with the Canadian Risley Group to form Columbus Communications Ltd – a Barbadian corporation that holds controlling interest in a number of telecommunications providers in the Caribbean including Cable Bahamas Ltd, Caribbean Crossings Ltd, Merit Communications Ltd, and FibralLink Jamaica Ltd.

In the tourism sector, Lee-Chin guided Portland through a number of acquisitions in the Caribbean. Among them were the hospitality operations of the Trident Villas and Spa in Jamaica, Reggae Beach, and Blue Lagoon.

Portland's first acquisition in the health care industry sector was announced in July 2006, when Medical Associates Ltd., a privately held hospital in Kingston, Jamaica, joined the Portland Group.

Commodities boom
Similar to the experience of the late 1990s, Lee-Chin again has shied away from investing in commodities and the energy market boom. He has specifically stated that "We [AIC] do not like commodities-type businesses nor most high-tech companies simply because they are implicitly poor enterprises which we would not want to hold for the long term".

Again, this strategy has meant that AIC has significantly underperformed the S&P index, but Lee-Chin stated in 2006 that he believed that the current boom is just another bubble. Lee-Chin describes the market since 1990 as "a series of rolling speculations", and now "we see a commodities bubble".

Business strategy
While at Investors Group, he studied the strategies of successful investors, such as Warren Buffett, Benjamin Graham and Kenneth Thomson. Their buy and hold strategy is easily recognizable in the motto of AIC – Buy, hold and prosper. He also invested in public investment management businesses which benefit from a rising market in two ways. In a rising market stock in portfolios go up and more people become investors and increase existing investment.

Business ventures owned or operated by Michael Lee Chin
Columbus Communications –
Columbus Communications Jamaica Ltd / Flow Jamaica 
FibraLink
CVM Television Group 
Merit Communications 
New World Network 
Americas Region Caribbean Optical-ring System (ARCOS)
Sauce Cable Company
Affordable Enterprise Ltd
Cabana Cable Ltd
Dynamic Corp, a company in the making Eastern Cable Network Ltd
Home Commercial Satellite Ltd
Universal Cable Network Ltd
Columbus Communications Trinidad Ltd/Flow Trinidad 
Columbus Communications Grenada Ltd/Flow Grenada 
Eastern Caribbean Gas Pipeline Company (ECGPC)
National Commercial Bank Jamaica (NCB) 
Radio Jamaica 
Reggae Beach (resort), Jamaica
Senvia
Total Finance Bank of Trinidad & Tobago Ltd
Trident Hotel (Resort)
Wallenford Coffee

See also
List of billionaires

References

External links 
Lee Chin secures US$80m for Caribbean fund (7 May 2006) – Jamaica Observer
Lee Chin's media push
Silver Rights
Breaking news
Michael Lee-Chin Family Institute for Corporate Citizenship

1951 births
Businesspeople from Ontario
Canadian billionaires
Canadian chief executives
Canadian investors
Canadian people of Chinese descent
Canadian philanthropists
Chief executives in the finance industry
Jamaican chief executives
Jamaican emigrants to Canada
Jamaican people of Chinese descent
McMaster University alumni
Members of the Order of Jamaica
Members of the Order of Ontario
Naturalized citizens of Canada
People from Port Antonio
Royal Ontario Museum
Living people
Wilfrid Laurier University people
Black Canadian businesspeople